The Government Savings Bank (1833) was a bank founded in the year 1833 in British India. The bank was the fifteenth oldest bank in India.

History

Founding 

The bank was founded in 1833 in Kolkata. Two more branches were opened at Bombay (Mumbai) and Madras (Chennai) in 1833 and 1834 with maximum deposit limit of Rs 500 at 4 per cent interest.

The bank played a major role in the early economic history of East Bengal and Bangladesh.

Management 

The bank had its branches in each of the three Presidencies of British India: Bombay, Madras and Bengal (Calcutta). These branches were later merged into a single entity.

Final Years 

The bank was finally closed and liquidated in 1843.

Legacy 

The bank is notable for being the fifteenth oldest bank in India.

The bank was the spiritual predecessor of the India Post Payments Bank.

See also

Indian banking
List of banks in India
List of oldest banks in India

References

External links
 Oldest Banks in India
 Banking in India

Defunct banks of India
Companies based in Kolkata
Banks established in 1833